Barney's Great Adventure (also known by its promotional title Barney's Great Adventure: The Movie) is a 1998 musical comedy adventure film based on the children's television series Barney & Friends, featuring Barney the Dinosaur in his first ever feature-length film. The plot follows Barney, along with three young children named Cody, Abby, and Marcella, as they discover a magical egg in a barn. After learning that the egg is a dream maker, Barney and the gang must return the egg to the barn before it hatches. The film was written by Stephen White, directed by Steve Gomer, produced by Sheryl Leach and Lyrick Studios and released by PolyGram Filmed Entertainment on March 27, 1998 at Radio City Music Hall in New York and worldwide on April 3, 1998 in the United States and Canada at the height of Barney's popularity.

The film received negative reviews from critics and was a box-office bomb, only grossing $12 million against a budget of $15 million. This was the third and final film to be produced by Lyrick Studios before it was acquired by and folded into HIT Entertainment on June 6, 2001. It is also the only theatrical Barney film as all other Barney films were just direct-to-video productions.

Plot

Cody, Abby, and Fig Newton, alongside Abby's best friend Marcella Walker are dropped off to the Newton's grandparents' farm for a whole week during summer break. As Cody believes there's nothing exciting at the farm, Abby and Marcella rub a Barney doll in his face. Cody starts a game of "keep-away" by taking the Barney doll and running off with it. The two go after Cody, who hides the doll in the bathroom. The girls catch up with Cody, who tells them to use their imagination and laughs when he thinks that nothing happened. However, the doll comes to life as Barney the Dinosaur takes the girls to play in the barn. Cody refuses to believe in Barney, and claims that real dinosaurs don't talk.

That night after dinner, the whole family is outside the front porch where Cody further discusses how Barney was in their barn and was not just a little doll. Grandpa then sings Let Me Call You Sweetheart to Grandma before he goes back inside with her and Fig. Right on cue, Barney appears after Fig and their grandparents went back inside and they sing Twinkle Twinkle Little Star before Abby and Marcella go back inside to play in the attic. Barney then gives Cody advice to wish upon a star. Cody takes his advice and wishes for a real adventure that summer and to do things no one else has done before. A shooting star deposits an egg in the barn, and Cody discovers it the next day. Barney and the kids go tell their grandparents about this, but Barney gets distracted when he hears Fig cry. Grandma suggests to Abby and Marcella that they go see Mrs. Goldfinch. Cody finds Barney in the baby room and takes him to see his grandparents, but Abby and Marcella take Cody and Barney to see Mrs. Goldfinch, who tells them that the egg is a dreammaker. Cody accidentally knocks the egg off the table which lands on a birdseed truck. Barney and the others recover it through a parade as the egg avoids being cracked by the people in the parade. Barney's friend B.J. catches it when it almost lands on the ground, but tosses it away. Barney and the gang chase the egg through a French restaurant where Barney sings If All The Raindrops, a circus where Barney and the kids sing We're Gonna Find A Way, and finally, they fly through the sky to continue their pursuit of it. However, they eventually make it back to the barn in time. All the while, Baby Bop is looking for her blanket and B.J. and Baby Bop arrive just in time to see the egg hatch.

After they return the egg to the barn, it finally hatches into a koala-like being named Twinken who shows everyone Abby's dream, then Barney's. Cody apologizes to Barney for being mean and says that he's cool. Barney accepts his apology and tells Cody he thinks he's cool too and the two share a hug. Twinken shows everyone a magical fireworks display which lands in Barney's arms. Barney begins to sing "I Love You", and the rest of the cast sings with him. Baby Bop gets sleepy, which prompts B.J. to decide they are ready to go home. The film ends with Twinken sitting next to Barney who has reverted into his doll form.

Cast

Production

Development
Word of a Barney film first arose in November 1992 when Debbie Ries, sales director for The Lyons Group said plans for a movie was in the works. In 1993, it was later announced by creator Sheryl Leach at The National Press Club in Washington, D.C. that a movie is coming. Later in 1994, a Barney Magazine article had stated that Barney the Dinosaur would star in his first ever film entitled Barney: The Movie.

At the time of development, all the major film studios wanted to do a Barney feature, with production companies pitching to the owners of Barney. One studio even assembled executives together to sing "I Love You" to Sheryl Leach when she arrived to the respective studio.

Trey Parker, the co-creator of South Park, was offered a million and a half dollars to direct the film, after the crew saw he could do funny things with kids since he did The Spirit of Christmas, although Parker politely declined the offer.

It was originally going to be distributed worldwide by Geffen Pictures through Warner Bros. and produced by Sheryl Leach and Dennis DeShazer. According to Sheryl Leach, it had a release date for summer 1995. Warner Bros. and Lyons had disagreements over marketing, leading the latter to bring the film (with help from now former producer Geffen) to PolyGram.

Steve Gomer, the director of the film, was approached for the film by an individual who called in regards that a musical Barney film was being made. Gomer had no interest in being apart of the Barney & Friends television series, but expressed interest in doing the film.

Filming
To Sheryl Leach, it was a joy of filming as she stated:
 Leach adds that the film allowed them to "take the familiar Barney and put him outdoors and in other very different settings from his traditional environments."

The film was shot in mid-September 1997 on locations outside Montreal, Canada, including the renowned Ste. AnnedeBellevue's Morgan Arboretum, a popular wildlife sanctuary. The veteran film crew was initially a bit skeptical of the large purple star. Gomer expressed his desire to work in Montreal, Canada to save on the cost of filming the movie.

Original version
According to writer Stephen White, he penned an initial script that was cut down for being too lengthy. In the original script, the egg was going to hatch a giant bird who misses its mother, Baby Bop and BJ were expected to make a lot more screen time, appearing in the farmhouse attic, but those scenes were soon scrapped, as director Steve Gomer claimed the scenes to be "unaffordable", Miss Goldfinch was originally planned to be a comedic character, as opposed to the more subdued character of the final film, the circus scenes and the "Collector" character were not in the original drafts, as well as rather than using a log, Barney and the gang would have built a plane out of cardboard boxes, and the film originally saw the main characters each have their own dreams and desires fulfilled by the end of the film.

Release

Critical reception
Barney's Great Adventure received mixed to negative reviews from film critics, owing to it being based on the aforementioned television program which is aimed for young children aged 2–7, the growing popularity of "anti-Barney humor", and the general unpopularity of the Barney series outside of its target audience of preschoolers. John Petrakis wrote in the Chicago Tribune, "If my 21-month-old son had any inkling that I was giving a less than stellar review to [this film,] he would no doubt shoot me that look he tends to give when his milk is warm or his Cheerios a bit stale." The New York Times''' Anita Gates wrote that it was a film "his young, undemanding fans are likely to enjoy." Roger Ebert gave the film three stars out of four and said: "Barney has his own movie. Not one of those videos you've watched a hundred times, but a real movie, more than an hour long. If you like him on TV, you'll like him here, too, because it's more of the same stuff, only outdoors and with animals and shooting stars and the kinds of balloons people can go up in."

Another review, from the Los Angeles Times, read: "The creators of the great purple scourge, Barney the Dinosaur, have an unspoken contract with parents palatable for all involved: We buy their videos and an occasional plush toy for our 3- and 4-year-olds and make Barney's brain trust obscenely wealthy; they in turn create benignly lobotomized entertainment that holds our non-demanding kids in thrall; our kids watch TV and allow us a few precious minutes of peace. The most important element is parental trust in Barney to be blandly wholesome, so that we have to endure only a few seconds of it while we cue up the VCR for our tykes. Family movies, on the other hand, imply a rather different contract: Parents buy tickets and popcorn for the whole family; filmmakers deliver light entertainment that kowtows to kids yet is not so brain-dead as to alienate sentient adults. 'Barney's Great Adventure: The Movie,' the first theatrical film featuring the green-bellied beast, takes that big old fat foot of Barney's and stomps that contract beyond recognition. [. . .] The flat lighting and two-dimensional sets of the TV screen serve Barney far better than a modestly expanded budget and a director insistent on using locations, romantic lighting and mildly adventurous camera angles. Barney looks both more real and more magical on video; on film, he's clearly a doofus in a felt outfit."

The review aggregator website Rotten Tomatoes reported an approval rating of 32% with an average score of 5.00/10, based on 25 reviews. The website's critical consensus reads, "Barney's friends are big and small / They come from lots of places / But after this film, their parents / Will be left with pained faces". On Metacritic, the film has a score of 44 out of 100 based on 18 critics, indicating "mixed or average reviews". 

It was nominated for two awards at the 19th Golden Raspberry Awards: Barney himself was nominated "Worst New Star", but lost to a tie with Jerry Springer in Ringmaster and Joe Eszterhas in An Alan Smithee Film: Burn Hollywood Burn. The Jerry Herman-penned "Barney, the Song" was nominated for "Worst Original Song", but lost to "I Wanna Be Mike Ovitz!" from An Alan Smithee Film: Burn Hollywood Burn''. It also received three nominations at the 1998 Stinkers Bad Movie Awards.

Box office
In its limited release weekend, the film grossed $2,203,865 from 540 theaters and ranked number 11. A week later, in wide release, it grossed $1,382,373 from 809 theaters and ranked number 15. By the end of its run, the film grossed $12,218,638 in the domestic box office, falling short of its $15 million budget.

Home media
In the United States, the film was released on VHS and DVD on September 1, 1998, and was reprinted on VHS in 2002 and 2003 by Universal. It was re-released on DVD in 2012, whilst in the United Kingdom, it was released on DVD in 2002.

References

External links
 

 
 Scriptwriter shares thoughts about Barney's Great Adventure

Barney & Friends
1998 films
1990s fantasy adventure films
1998 independent films
1990s musical fantasy films
American fantasy adventure films
American children's comedy films
American children's fantasy films
American independent films
American musical fantasy films
Canadian fantasy adventure films
Canadian children's comedy films
Canadian children's fantasy films
Canadian independent films
Films based on television series
PolyGram Filmed Entertainment films
Canadian musical fantasy films
Films about dinosaurs
Films scored by Van Dyke Parks
Mattel Creations films
Films directed by Steve Gomer
1990s English-language films
1990s American films
1990s Canadian films
English-language Canadian films